Brian Thomas Burrell (born March 23, 1972) is an American–Hong Kong actor best known for his roles in Cantonese television productions in Hong Kong. Burrell is also one of the few non-Chinese actors in Hong Kong broadcaster TVB's artiste profiles over the years.

Early life
Burrell was born in Salt Lake City, Utah of French ancestry, and graduated from the University of Utah with a degree in Chinese Literature and Asian Studies in 1999. Burrell first went to Hong Kong in 1995 to teach English, and permanently left the US for Hong Kong in 1999. He can also speak with different accents and read in Cantonese, Mandarin and Cambodian.

Acting career
Brian began his acting career in 2001, when he took a minor role on TVB's A Case of Misadventure. Brian eventually gave up his job in the information technology sector to become an actor, and was later signed on by TVB as an artiste.

He was introduced to television acting by another European-looking actor in Hong Kong: Gregory Charles Rivers. Since entering TVB, Burrell has acted in many different television series.

As one of the few non-Chinese actors regularly appearing in Hong Kong TV, Brian was featured in an in-depth interview and feature story 'Hello Neighbour' in the October 2007 issue of Muse.

Since entering TVB, he has acted in many different television series, participated in a number of advertisements, and been an emcee and guest for a lot of variety shows and company events.

External links
 
 Official Page on alivenotdead

References

1972 births
American emigrants to Hong Kong
American male television actors
Living people
Male actors from Salt Lake City
Hong Kong male television actors
Hong Kong people of American descent
TVB actors
21st-century Hong Kong male actors
University of Utah alumni
American people of French descent
American born Hong Kong artists